The Colombian spider monkey (Ateles fusciceps rufiventris) is a subspecies of the Black-headed spider monkey, a type of New World monkey, found in Colombia and Panama.  Some authorities, such as Froelich (1991), Collins and Dubach (2001) and Nieves (2005), do not recognize the Black-headed spider monkey as a distinct species and so treat the Colombian spider monkey as a subspecies of Geoffroy's spider monkey.

It is entirely black with some white on its chin while the Brown-headed spider monkey (A. f. fusciceps) has a black or brown body and a brown head.

The spider monkey has a black body and long limbs with thumb-less hands.  It has a prehensile and extremely flexible tail, which acts as an extra limb.  The tail has a hairless patch on the tip that is used for grip.  This hairless patch is unique in its markings, just like the human fingerprint.  Colombian spider monkeys can weigh up to 9.1 kg (20 pounds).  Fruit makes up eighty percent of the spider monkey's diet, which also includes leaves, nuts, seeds, bark, insects, and flowers. Spider monkeys contribute to the dispersion of undigested seeds from the fruits they eat. This monkey lives approximately 24 years.

Spider monkeys are found in social groups of up to 30 individuals; however, they are usually broken up into smaller foraging groups of 3-4 individuals.  They move and climb through the forest by hand over hand (brachiation) motion.

References

External links
 Animal Bytes

Primates of Central America
Mammals of Colombia
Spider monkeys
Mammals described in 1872
Taxa named by Philip Sclater